Cham Seyyed Mohammad (also Romanized as Cham Seyyed Moḩammad, Chame-e Seyyed Moḩammad, and Cham-e Seyyed Moḩammad) is a village in Saroleh Rural District, Meydavud District, Bagh-e Malek County, Khuzestan Province, Iran. At the 2006 census, its population was 269, in 54 families.

References 

Populated places in Bagh-e Malek County